Hoyleton may refer to:
 Hoyleton, Illinois
 Hoyleton, South Australia